Milligan is a small unincorporated community in southern Harrison Township, Perry County, Ohio, United States.  It is located on State Route 93 between Crooksville and New Lexington.

Milligan's main significance lies in its being the location of the lowest recorded temperature in Ohio history, -39° Fahrenheit.  This temperature was recorded at a United States Weather Bureau station on February 10, 1899, during the Great Blizzard of 1899, when the entire state experienced bitterly cold weather for over a week.  It is believed that Milligan is so cold because of its location within the valley of the Moxahala Creek, into which cold air flows from the surrounding hills.

A post office called Milligan was established in 1893, and remained in operation until 1902.

References

Unincorporated communities in Ohio
Unincorporated communities in Perry County, Ohio
1893 establishments in Ohio
Populated places established in 1893